"Talking" is a single release from British indie rock band The Rifles. It was made available as a free download and on a one-sided 7" vinyl.

The song was given the accolade of 'Hottest Record in the World' by BBC Radio 1 DJ Zane Lowe, and hit number 48 on the UK Singles Chart on downloads alone.

The Rifles released "Talking (New Version)" as a B-side to their single "The Great Escape" on 22 June 2009.

Track listing
7" PR017037
 Talking

2007 singles
The Rifles (band) songs
2007 songs
679 Artists singles